Dragan Ćirić (Serbian Cyrillic: Драган Ћирић; born 15 September 1974) is a Serbian retired professional footballer who played as an attacking midfielder for Partizan, Barcelona, AEK Athens, and Real Valladolid. Internationally, he played for the national team of Yugoslavia, earning 4 caps.

Club career

Early career
After starting out at local club Srem Jakovo, Belgrade-born Ćirić finished his development at Partizan, sharing teams with the likes of Savo Milošević and Albert Nađ. This trio was promoted to the senior squad in 1992–93, as they won the league in that and the following seasons under manager Ljubiša Tumbaković. Ćirić conquered a further two national championships during his first spell and was the team's captain in the 1996–97 season.

Barcelona
In July 1997, Ćirić signed a four-year contract with Barcelona. Over the course of his career at Barcelona, he played 35 games across all competitions in his debut season. In addition into featuring in Barcelona's 1997–98 UEFA Champions League campaign, he also contributed to the team's treble conquest of La Liga, Copa del Rey and the UEFA Super Cup. Coach Louis van Gaal employed Ćirić primarily as a right-winger, although it was not his best position. After losing his spot in the lineup he was loaned to Greek side AEK Athens in a season-long move, scoring in double digits and also winning the domestic cup. Upon his return to the Camp Nou, he was sold to fellow Spaniards Real Valladolid in July 2000.

Return to Partizan
In June 2004, Ćirić returned to Partizan, signing a three-year contract. Under coach Vladimir Vermezović, he helped the club win the national league in his comeback season with an unbeaten record. He also played in Partizan's historic 2004–05 UEFA Cup campaign, up to their elimination in the final 16 by CSKA Moscow. After that season, he retired shortly after at the age of 31.

International career
Ćirić was capped four times for Yugoslavia. He made his debut in a 4–1 friendly win against El Salvador on 12 November 1995, coming on as a substitute for Dejan Petković.

Administrative career
In December 2014, Ćirić was named director of football at Partizan. He left the position less than two months later, citing dissatisfaction with the state of Serbian football as the main reason for his decision.

Career statistics

Club

International

Honours
Partizan
 First League of FR Yugoslavia: 1992–93, 1993–94, 1995–96, 1996–97, 2004–05
 FR Yugoslavia Cup: 1993–94

Barcelona
 La Liga: 1997–98, 1998–99
 Copa del Rey: 1997–98
 UEFA Super Cup: 1997

AEK Athens
 Greek Cup: 1999–2000

References

External links

 
 
 

1974 births
Living people
Footballers from Belgrade
Serbian footballers
Association football midfielders
Yugoslav First League players
FK Partizan players
La Liga players
FC Barcelona players
Real Valladolid players
Super League Greece players
AEK Athens F.C. players
Serbia and Montenegro international footballers
Serbia and Montenegro expatriate footballers
Serbia and Montenegro footballers
Expatriate footballers in Spain
Expatriate footballers in Greece
Serbia and Montenegro expatriate sportspeople in Spain
Serbia and Montenegro expatriate sportspeople in Greece
FK Partizan non-playing staff